"I'm Your Pusher" is a song by German band Scooter based on the melody of "Flieger, Grüß' Mir Die Sonne" by Allan Gray and Walter Reisch. It was released in May 2000 as the lead single off the album Sheffield. It is the first single to be released from the sublabel of Kontor Records, Sheffield Tunes.

Chart performance

References

Scooter (band) songs
2000 singles
Songs written by H.P. Baxxter
Songs written by Rick J. Jordan
2000 songs
Songs written by Jens Thele